Movin' In is an album by drummer Specs Powell released by the Roulette label in 1957.

Track listing 
All compositions by Specs Powell except where noted
 "Undecided" (Charlie Shavers, Sid Robin) – 2:49
 "All or Nothing at All" (Arthur Altman, Jack Lawrence) – 3:00
 "It's Pity to Say Goodnight" (Mack Gordon, Billy Reid) – 2:48
 "You Don't Know What Love Is" (Gene de Paul, Don Raye) – 2:35
 "The Spider" – 5:21
 "Rat Race" – 2:49
 "Suspension" – 3:29
 "Locked Out" – 2:50
 "He's My Guy" (de Paul, Raye) – 2:39
 "I'll Remember April"  (de Paul, Raye, Patricia Johnston) – 2:31
 "Dispossessed" (Powell, Henry Glover) –  2:35
 "Moving In" – 3:01

Personnel 
Specs Powell – drums
Ray Copeland – trumpet, arranger
Leon Merian – trumpet
Jimmie Dahl, Jimmy Cleveland – trombone
George Dorsey – alto saxophone, flute
Sahib Shihab – alto saxophone, baritone saxophone
Aaron Sachs – tenor saxophone, clarinet
Pritchard Cheeseman – baritone saxophone
Hank Jones, Nat Pierce – piano 
Clyde Lombardi – bass

References 

Specs Powell albums
1957 albums
Roulette Records albums